The UK Afrobeats Singles Chart, is a chart that ranks the best-performing Afrobeats singles in the UK. Its data is published and compiled by Official Charts Company,  from digital downloads, physical record sales, and audio streams in UK retail outlets. At the end of a year, OCC will publish an annual list of its 20 most successful Afrobeats songs, throughout that year on its website, and BBC Radio 1Xtra's website. For 2020, the list was published on 28 January 2021, by Rob Copsey, and calculated with data from August 1, 2020, to December 26, 2020.

History

Darkoo's "Gangsta", led the end year chart, at number one. The song was among the first record to receive the UK Official Number 1 Award.

Year-end list

See also
 2020 in British music
 UK Afrobeats Singles Chart

References

British record charts
2020 record charts